The gracile shrew mole (Uropsilus gracilis) is a species of mammal in the family Talpidae. It is endemic to China; populations known from Myanmar likely represent other species (see below).

The black-backed shrew mole (U. atronates) and the Snow Mountain shrew mole (U. nivatus) were formerly considered subspecies, but a 2018 phylogenetic study split them as distinct species. The study found U. gracilis to be the sister species to an undescribed species of Uropsilus, with the clade comprising both being sister to U. atronates. U. atronates and the clade containing U. gracilis likely diverged during the early-mid Pleistocene.

References

Uropsilus
Mammals of China
Mammals of Myanmar
Mammals described in 1911
Taxa named by Oldfield Thomas
Taxonomy articles created by Polbot